Seventh Son may refer to:
 Seventh Son (novel), a novel by Orson Scott Card
 7th Son: Descent, a novel by J.C. Hutchins
 The Seventh Son (film), a 1926 silent German film
 Seventh Son (film), a 2014 fantasy film
 "The Seventh Son", a "standard" blues song written by Willie Dixon
 Seventh Son, an album by Georgie Fame

See also
 Seventh son of a seventh son, a concept in folklore
 Seventh Son of a Seventh Son, an  Iron Maiden album